Canellakis, Kanellakis, Κανελλάκης is a Greek surname. Notable people with the surname include:

Karina Canellakis (born 1981), American conductor and violinist
Nicholas Canellakis (born 1984), American cellist
Paris Kanellakis (1953 – 1995),  Greek American computer scientist

Greek-language surnames